Terekti is a district of West Kazakhstan Region in western Kazakhstan. The administrative center of the district is the selo of Terekti. Population:

Geography
Lake Shalkar is located in the district.

References

Districts of Kazakhstan
West Kazakhstan Region